The 2012–13 season is Citizen AA's 9th season in football in Hong Kong First Division League. Citizen AA will seek to win a trophy for a season, as they failed to defend the Senior Challenge Shield trophy. The club will also be competing in the Senior Challenge Shield and the FA Cup.

Key Events
 9 June 2012: Hong Kong defender Chan Hin Kwong joins Citizen from Tuen Mun for an undisclosed fee.
 10 August 2012: Nigerian forward Kelvin Orieke Mba joins Citizen for free.
 27 January 2013: Citizen was defeated by Wofoo Tai Po in the final of the Senior Shield as they lost 3–5 in penalties after a 2–2 tie after 90 minutes and extra time.

Players

First team
As of 27 January 2013.

Remarks:
NR Player is not registered and therefore ineligible to play any local matches.
FP These players are registered as foreign players.

Players with dual nationality:
  Festus Baise (Local player)
  Moses Mensah (Local player)
  Yuan Yang (Local player)

Transfers

In

Out

Stats

Squad Stats

Top scorers
 As of 4 May 2013

Disciplinary record
 As of 14 April 2013

Competitions

Overall

First Division League

Classification

Results summary

Results by round

Matches

Pre-season

Competitive

First Division League

Senior Challenge Shield

First round

Quarter-finals

Semi-finals

Final

FA Cup

First round

Remarks: 
1 The capacity of Aberdeen Sports Ground is originally 9,000, but only the 4,000-seated main stand is opened for football match.

References

Citizen AA seasons
Citizen